Chromis degruyi is a species of fish in the family Pomacentridae. It differs from its cogenerates on a colour and morphological basis.

References

Further reading
Allen, Gerald R., and Mark V. Erdmann. "Two new species of damselfishes (Pomacentridae: Chromis) from Indonesia." Aqua, International Journal of Ichthyology 15.3 (2009): 121–134.
Quéro, Jean-Claude, Jérôme Spitz, and Jean-Jacques Vayne. "Chromis durvillei: une nouvelle espèce de Pomacentridae de l’île de la Réunion (France, océan Indien) et premier signalement pour l’île de Chromis axillaris."Cybium 33.4 (2009): 321–326.

External links

degruyi
Fish described in 2008